Craig Turley (born 24 August 1965) is a retired Australian rules footballer who played with West Coast in the Australian Football League (AFL) during the early 1990s.

Turley had his best season in 1991 where he finished second behind Jim Stynes in the Brownlow Medal count, and won his club's best and fairest. He was also included in the All-Australian team.

In 1996 he was named at the half forward line in the Eagles' official 'Team of the Decade'.

External links

1965 births
Living people
Australian rules footballers from Western Australia
West Coast Eagles players
West Coast Eagles Premiership players
Melbourne Football Club players
West Perth Football Club players
All-Australians (AFL)
John Worsfold Medal winners
Western Australian State of Origin players
One-time VFL/AFL Premiership players